Halima Namakula (born January 1, 1960) is a Ugandan musician, actress, entrepreneur and humanitarian who in 2009 was nominated to represent Uganda in the Mrs. World beauty pageant.

Acting 

Halima Namakula started her career as a stage actress when she was young and in school with the group called "The Black Pearls". Namakula's acting partner, husband, and the father of her children died in 1994.
Though her stage name is Halima Namakula, she sometimes referred to as "the mother of all artists". In the 1990s after the death of her husband, Namakula relocated back to her home country and continued on with her acting, joining a TV soap opera, “That's Life Mwattu”, as Michelle.

Humanitarian efforts 

Halima Namakula is the founding member of Women At Work International, a non-government organization that helps to take commercial sex workers off the streets by creating job opportunities for them.

Discography 

Since 1999 Halima Namakula has released five studio albums: and they were all done under her own record label, No-End Entertainment.

Albums 

 1999 Ekimbeewo 
 2000 Tonkutula
 2001 Kyama Kyange
 2004 Cheza aka Sambagala
 2008 Ntuse Jendaga

Singles 

Music videos:
 Ekimbeewo
 Tonkutula
 Omusajja Waa Taxi
 Tuzina
 Cheza
 Sambagala
 Africa Yetu
 Watoto Wa Mungu
 Kibaduguda

In 2008 Namakula celebrated her 10th anniversary in the music industry right after she had what the media called "a flopped show" at Kati Kati with K-Ci & Jojo.
In April 2012 Namakula released a song call "Digida" meaning dance, but this time she stayed away from the nursery rhymes she's known for.

Controversy 
In 2003 Halima Namakula's Radio station Beat FM was shut down by the broadcasting Council for operating without a license.
In 2007 Halima Namakula was sued for sh57million Uganda shillings (about US$25,000) for running over a three-year-old child.
In 2012 Halima was arrested for littering the city of Kampala with posters of her Ndimuzadde concert at Club Obligatto.

Nominations and recognitions 

 2004 Kora Awards - Nominee
 2005 Kora Awards - Nominee
 2009 Divas Awards, presented her with a Lifetime Achievement Award.
 2009/2010 New Vision & DFCU “Woman Achiever Of The Year Award.
 In 2009 she was Mrs. Uganda and represented Uganda in the 2009 Mrs. World pageant that took place in Vung Tau, Vietnam.

References 

 https://www.softpower.ug/men-advised-against-abandoning-wives-suffering-fistula/

 https://observer.ug/lifestyle/60733-halima-namakula-s-eight-year-fistula-fight-gets-boost

 www.monitor.co.ug/SpecialReports/Fistula-survivors-share-their-experiences/688342-5202684-view-asAMP-k8901fz/index.html

 https://www.newvision.co.ug/new_vision/news/1503730/awarded-supporting-fistula-stricken-wives

 https://bigeye.ug/photos-halima-namakula-in-fistula-fight-campaign-this-weekend/

 http://www.sunrise.ug/news/202002/wawi-to-extend-health-support-to-victims-of-human-trafficking.html

 https://nilepost.co.ug/2018/09/30/miss-norway-miss-uganda-in-fistula-awareness-campaign/?mode=list

 https://amp.howwebiz.ug/news/celebrity/12892/several-singers-join-together-for-fistula-charity-walk.

 https://www.independent.co.ug/halima-namakula-singer-mother-humanitarian/

 https://newslexpoint.com/halima-namakula-eliminate-fistula-ug/amp/

 https://amp/s/mbu.ug/2020/07/10/afrigos-moses-matovu-features-in-halima-namakulas-ndikadiwa-nawe-video/amp/

 https://www.newvision.co.ug/news/1522414/represent-elderly-parliament-halima-namakula

 https://nilepost.co.ug/2020/05/26/singer-halima-namakula-surprises-kadaga-at-parliament-throws-for-her-birthday-mini-concert/

 https://bigeye.ug/halima-namakula-resurfaces-with-ndikadiwa-nawe-watch-video-here/

 https://bigeye.ug/halima-namakula-cautions-chameleone-against-involving-in-fights-following-diggy-baur-saga/

1960 births
Living people
Ugandan musicians